The Toyota Sora is a transit bus with an electric motor powered by hydrogen fuel cells produced by Toyota, developed in cooperation with Hino Motors. The bus uses components originally developed for the Toyota Mirai, a mid-size fuel cell sedan. The name Sora is an abbreviation of the words Sky, Ocean, River and Air and refers to the water cycle.

The Sora uses two sets of polymer electrolyte fuel cells with an output of 155 hp. The bus is also equipped with a power system, it can be used as an emergency source of electricity, providing external consumers with up to 235 kWh of electricity with a maximum power of 9 kW.

The bus has an environment monitoring system based on eight cameras located inside and outside the vehicle. The system detects pedestrians and cyclists in the vicinity and alerts the driver to their presence using audible and visual signals. The bus is also equipped with the acceleration control function, which, in view of the safety of standing passengers, prevents too rapid acceleration.

The bus is equipped with a radar and a collision warning system, as well as an additional solution to avoid a collision when turning right, which warns the driver about oncoming vehicles or the presence of pedestrians. An additional system alerts the driver when he does not start to brake approaching the red light and additionally displays the time remaining until the signal changes. The Emergency Driving Stop System also allows passengers to stop the vehicle in an emergency, for example when the driver collapses.

The Sora cooperates with the ITS Connect system, which uses communication between vehicles and between vehicles and road infrastructure to improve driving safety, as well as systems supporting bus convoys and ensuring priority at traffic lights (Public Transportation Priority Systems). Toyota buses can exchange information about traffic, pedestrians or changes in lights with other vehicles.

History 
The Sora made its debut at the Tokyo Motor Show in 2017.  It went on sale in Japan in 2018. More than 100 buses will be in the public transport fleet, mainly in Tokyo, ahead of the 2020 Olympic and Paralympic Games, which will take place in the Japanese capital.

In Europe, the Sora is sold as a chassis fitted with Caetano H2.City Gold bodywork supplied by Portuguese manufacturer Salvador Caetano, who have been a long-time partner for importing Toyota commercial vehicles into Europe. , numerous orders for Caetano-bodied Soras have been placed, predominantly in Germany.

References 

Buses of Japan
Electric buses
Sora
Fuel cell buses
Vehicles introduced in 2018